Mads Christian Kruse Andersen (born 25 March 1978 in Lolland) is a Danish lightweight rower. He won a gold medal at the 2008 Summer Olympics in the lightweight coxless four event together with Thomas Ebert, Eskild Ebbesen, and Morten Jørgensen, making up the Gold Four.

References

1978 births
Living people
Danish male rowers
Olympic rowers of Denmark
Rowers at the 2008 Summer Olympics
Olympic gold medalists for Denmark
Olympic medalists in rowing
Medalists at the 2008 Summer Olympics
World Rowing Championships medalists for Denmark
21st-century Danish people